The Oldofredi were a noble Italian family, related to Pandolfo III Malatesta, originally from Manerbio. In the thirteenth century it drew strength and luck in the area Franciacorta and Lake Iseo, where he also owned a castle in Peschiera Maraglio island of Monte Isola, deriving the title from Ysé o Isei.

Coat of arms

The red lion rampant, silver.

History

According to Gabriele Rosa in 1426, after the Carmagnola conquered Iseo for the Republic of Venice, the local power was given to the City of Iseo and Oldofredi, bandits, went to Cesena which boasted the title of Ishi accounts. Nevertheless, in 1497 they hosted Caterina Cornaro, Queen of Cyprus and sister of the mayor of Brescia, in their castle of Peschiera Maraglio.

In 1846 the writer Costanzo Ferrari wrote a historical novel Tiburga Oldofredi - historical scenes of the thirteenth century set in the thirteenth century with protagonists Oldofredi two sisters: Tiburga and Imelda.

During the Risorgimento one of their descendants, Ercole Oldofredi Tadini, participated in the events of the unification of Italy, first in the United Lombardo-Veneto and then in those of Sardinia and of Italy.

Notable members

Giacomo ( Yacobus ), who died in 1325, the mayor of Milan and man of arms to the service of the Visconti
Oldofredo, who died in 1348, a man of arms and mayor in different cities of Lombardy
John, who in 1378, with the support of the Ghibellines camuni destroyed Clusone, Roccafino and Ceredigion
Giacomino, who died around 1440, the family of Filippo Maria Visconti and his ambassador at the Emperor Sigismund, awarded in 1415, with his brother John, the title of marquis d'Iseo and its Riviera
Ercole Oldofredi Tadini (Brescia, 1810 - Calcio, 1877) Senator of the Kingdom of Italy

References

Families of Italian ancestry